Rafael García Aguilera (born 28 May 1990), commonly known as Bebe, is a Spanish futsal player who plays for Cartagena as a defender.

Honours
UEFA Futsal Champions League fourth place: 2018–19

External links
LNFS profile
UEFA profile

1990 births
Living people
Futsal defenders
Sportspeople from Córdoba, Spain
Spanish men's futsal players
ElPozo Murcia FS players
FS Cartagena players
Inter FS players